Janel Leppin (born 1981) is an American singer, jazz cellist and multi-instrumentalist. She has performed at the San Francisco Museum of Modern Art, the Kennedy Center for the Performing Arts and at many international festivals worldwide including the High Zero Festival, the Swedish Women in Jazz Festival, DC Jazz Festival and Washington Women in Jazz Festival. She has acted as curator for works shown at the Kennedy Center for the Performing Arts and the ISSUE Project Room.

Leppin has released three solo recordings, Mellow Diamond (2016), Songs for Voice and Mellotron (2016), and American God (2017).  She collaborates as part of Janel and Anthony with her husband, American guitar player Anthony Pirog. Recordings of her work as a composer and side musician appear on Sacred Bones, Bella Union, Touch, Tzadik, Sub Pop, Editions Mego, Sister Polygon, Dischord Records, Ideologic Organ and Cuneiform Records. Her work uses experimental, avant-garde, jazz, free jazz, classical, ambient and rock influences.

Janel and Anthony

Leppin recorded two albums with Anthony Pirog as "Janel and Anthony": one self-titled and self-released recording in 2007, and Where is Home, released by Cuneiform Records, in 2012. A Fifth Anniversary Collectors Edition LP was released of the duo, recorded in 2010. In March 2016, they released the single "Sweet and Sour".

In February 2016, Leppin started a label called Wedderburn Records which releases "music which has a magical or mystical essence." The label's first release was "Sweet and Sour" by Janel and Anthony, followed by Leppin's first two solo albums, Mellow Diamond and Songs for Voice and Mellotron.

Solo Recordings

In April 2016, Leppin released two solo recordings. For the first album titled, Mellow Diamond, Leppin drew from far and wide, from avant-garde pop to ambient style. She recorded analog synthesizers, a harpsichord, pedal steel, a cello, mellotron, found sound samples, and radio frequencies. Several political messages are found in the work, notably in "Belly of the Beast" which is about living in Washington D.C., as well as in "Cast in Gold."

The second album, originally titled Songs of the One-Armed Woman, Songs for Voice and Mellotron, was written in 2015, when Leppin injured her right elbow and was unable to perform solo concerts on her primary instrument, the cello. The EP-length recording includes politically-charged music, such as "Paris," which calls for people to remember all victims from terrorist attacks after the deaths in Paris in 2015 and brings attention to the possible effects of American drone strikes. The second track, "In A Dream," is about global warming. Most tracks were recorded live with Leppin singing and playing the M4000D (mellotron) simultaneously, with very little overdubbing.

Leppin's most recent album, American God, was released in April 2017. This album continues with political themes, as Leppin put it together with the 2016 Presidential Election in mind.

Jazz Works

Leppin leads Ensemble Volcanic Ash, jazz group including harp, cello, alto saxophone, tenor saxophone, guitar, bass and drums. The group was premiered before a sold-out crowd at the legendary Bohemian Caverns in Washington D.C. to rave reviews, being called "Aaah-vant Garde  at its finest." The ensemble has included Luke Stewart, Kim Sator, Sarah Hughes, Mary Lattimore, Kim Sator, Brian Settles, Anthony Pirog, Larry Ferguson, Amy Frasier, Jacqueline Poullaf, Betsy Wright and Jaimie Branch.

Also Appears On

References

Living people
American jazz cellists
1981 births
21st-century American women musicians
21st-century cellists